Simon Emmerson (12 March 1956 – 13 March 2023) was an English musician and record producer. He founded the bands Working Week, Weekend, and Afro Celt Sound System.

Career
Emmerson was also the main organiser of The Imagined Village, a collaborative work from many roots artists.  Emmerson also played on this album.

In 1995 Emmerson was nominated for a Grammy for his production work on Baaba Maal's album Firin' in Fouta.

Earlier in his career, under the pseudonym Simon Booth, he was a member of the bands Working Week and Weekend, played guitar on Everything but the Girl's debut album Eden and produced records for Baaba Maal and Manu Dibango.

Personal life and death
Emmerson was also a keen bird watcher and a druid.

Emmerson died on 13 March 2023, one day after his 67th birthday.

Discography

Afro Celt Sound System
See Afro Celt Sound System

Production credits
Firin' in Fouta - Baaba Maal (1994)
Witness - Show of Hands (2006)
The Imagined Village - Various (Real World Records 2007)

References

External links

The Imagined Village website
Real World Records website
ECC Records
Mix for Folk Radio UK by Simon Emmerson (The Imagined Village) 

1956 births
2023 deaths
English record producers
English pop guitarists
English rock guitarists
English folk guitarists
English male guitarists
Afro Celt Sound System members
Working Week (band) members
Musicians from London